Over one hundred officials of provincial-ministerial level and above have been implicated by the anti-corruption campaign in China, which began after the 18th National Congress of the Chinese Communist Party in 2012. The number of officials implicated below the provincial level are much higher. The tables on this list includes only officials for which a case has been initiated by the Central Commission for Discipline Inspection.

National leaders

Former and sitting Central Committee members

Provincial-ministerial level

Generals of the military
 Cai Guangliao, major general, deputy director of the Social and Legislative Committee of the Guangdong People's Political Consultative Conference
 Chen Qiang, major general, Deputy Commander of 96351 Unit of the Second Artillery Corps
 Dai Weimin, major general, Deputy Dean at the People's Liberation Army Nanjing Political College
 Deng Ruihua, major general, Political Commissar of the Joint Logistics Department of Lanzhou Military Region
 Dong Mingxiang, major general, Head of the Joint Logistics Department of Beijing Military Region
 Duan Tianjie, major general, deputy director of the Political Department of PLA National Defence University
 Fan Changmi, lieutenant general, alternate Central Committee member, Deputy Political Commissar of Lanzhou Military Region
 Fang Wenping, major general, Commander of Shanxi Military District
 Fu Linguo, major general, Deputy Chief of Staff of Command of the People's Liberation Army General Logistics Department
 Fu Yi, major general, Commander of Zhejiang Military Command
 Gao Xiaoyan (female), major general, Political Commissar and Discipline Inspection Secretary of the PLA Information Engineering University
 Gu Junshan, lieutenant general, former deputy director of the People's Liberation Army General Logistics Department
 Guo Boxiong, general, former Vice Chairman of the Central Military Commission, member of the 17th Politburo
 Guo Zhenggang, major general, Deputy Political Commissar of Zhejiang Military District, son of Guo Boxiong
 Jiang Zhonghua, rear admiral, Head of the armament department of the South Sea Fleet, committed suicide
 Kou Tie, major general, Commander of Heilongjiang Military District
 Liu Zhanqi, major general of the Armed Police, Chief of the People's Armed Police traffic command
 Liu Zheng, lieutenant general, Deputy Head of the People's Liberation Army General Logistics Department
 Ma Faxiang, vice admiral, Deputy Political Commissar of the People's Liberation Army Navy, committed suicide
 Wang Minggui, major general, Political Commissar of People's Liberation Army Air Force Command College
 Wang Yufa, lieutenant general, former Deputy political commissar of the Guangzhou Military Region
 Wei Jin, major general, Deputy Political Commissar of Tibet Military District
 Xu Caihou, general, former Vice Chairman of the Central Military Commission, member of the 17th Politburo
 Yang Jinshan, lieutenant general, member of the Central Committee, Deputy Commander of Chengdu Military Region
 Ye Wanyong, major general, Political Commissar of Sichuan Military District
 Yu Daqing, lieutenant general, Deputy Political Commissar of the Second Artillery Corps
 Zhan Guoqiao, major general, Head of the Joint Logistics Department of Lanzhou Military Region
 Zhan Jun, major general, Deputy Commander of Hubei Military District
 Zhang Daixin, major general, Deputy Commander of Heilongjiang Military District
 Zhang Qibin, major general, Deputy Chief of Staff of the Jinan Military Region
 Zhang Wansong, major general, Director of the Joint Logistics Department of Lanzhou Military Region
 Zhou Guotai, major general, Deputy Head of Oil Supplies Division of PLA General Logistics Department
 Zhou Minggui, major general, deputy director of the Political Department of Nanjing Military Region

Other notable cases
Adil Nurmemet, mayor of Hotan, ethnic Uyghur
Feng Lixiang, party chief of Datong
Guo Yipin, vice-mayor of Luoyang, went into hiding upon learning that he might be under investigation; later arrested
Jia Xiaoye, Zhou Yongkang's wife. She was sentenced to 9 years in prison for taking bribes, influence-using bribery by the Intermediate People's Court in Yichang on June 15, 2016
Jiang Zunyu, head of the Political and Legal Affairs Commission of Shenzhen; sentenced to life in prison but denied most of the charges against him
Li Huabo, a former local official in Poyang county, Jiangxi Province. Evaded Chinese authorities and went to Singapore in 2011, and deported from Singapore in 2015. Li was sentenced to life in prison for corruption worth 94 million yuan by the Intermediate People's Court in Shangrao on January 23, 2017
Ma Chaoqun, a municipal water works administrator from Qinhuangdao. Gained notoriety because millions of dollars of bribes were located in his apartment during an investigation by the authorities
Qu Songzhi, Li Chuncheng's wife, former director of the Red Cross Society of Chengdu. She was sentenced to seven years in prison for taking bribes on January 8, 2016
Tao Yuchun,  a former senior executive of China National Petroleum Corporation (CNPC). On  September 27, 2016, Tao was sentenced  to 23 years in prison for corruption worth 46 million yuan, embezzle public funds  worth 9 million yuan, illegal profits for relatives, abuse power by the Intermediate People's Court in Zhuhai 
Wang Guoqiang, a former Party chief of Fengcheng city in northeast China's Liaoning Province . Evaded Chinese authorities and went to overseas countries in 2012, and deported from the United States in 2014. Wang was sentenced to 8 years in prison for taking bribes worth 9.59 million yuan and unidentified huge property by the Intermediate People's Court in Shenyang on January 23, 2017
Wei Pengyuan, a former deputy director of the National Energy Administration's coal department. Gained notoriety because worth over 200 million yuan of cash of bribes were found in his house in Beijing in 2014. On October 17, 2016, Wei was sentenced to death with a two-year reprieve without commutation or parole when the sentence was automatically reduced to life imprisonment for taking bribes worth 211.7 million yuan and unidentified 131 million yuan property by the Intermediate People's Court in Baoding
Yang Xiaobo (female), mayor of Gaoping, Shanxi
Yang Xiuzhu (female), former deputy director of Zhejiang Construction Department and deputy mayor of Wenzhou. Evaded Chinese authorities and went to overseas countries in 2003, and deported from the United States in 2016
Yu Tieyi, a former deputy manager of the supply division of the Longmay Mining Holding Group. On October 21, 2016, Yu was sentenced to death with a two-year reprieve without commutation or parole when the sentence was automatically reduced to life imprisonment for taking bribes worth 306.8 million yuan by the Intermediate People's Court of Heilongjiang Forest Region in Harbin
Zhong Shijian, Guangdong party discipline official who was himself investigated
Zhou Bin, Zhou Yongkang's son. He was sentenced to 18 years in prison for taking bribes, influence-using bribery, unlawful business operation by the Intermediate People's Court in Yichang on June 15, 2016
Zhou Feng, Zhou Yongkang's nephew. He was sentenced to 12 years in prison for write false value added tax invoices, influence-using bribery by the Intermediate People's Court in Yichang on June 17, 2016

Non-political personalities
 Gu Xin, musician, former executive chairman of the China Oriental Performing Arts Group
 Liu Han, former Sichuan development mogul, former executive chairman of Hanlong Group, executed
 Mao Xiaofeng, former chief executive of China Minsheng Bank, thought to be implicated in the Ling Jihua case
 Rui Chenggang, CCTV economics channel anchor, linked to Ling Jihua and others by Chinese-language media
 Xu Xiang, stock trader
 Ye Yingchun, CCTV anchor, speculated by numerous media sources as having had sexual relations with Zhou Yongkang
 Huang Hong, comedian known for skit performances on the CCTV New Year's Gala, fired from his leading post at the August 1st Film Studios in 2015, thought to have been implicated in corruption but not charged

References

Chinese Communist Party
2010s in China
Corruption in China
Anti-corruption measures